3854 George, provisional designation: , is a stony Hungaria asteroid and Mars-crosser from the innermost regions of the asteroid belt, approximately  in diameter. It was discovered on 13 March 1983, by American astronomer couple Carolyn and Eugene Shoemaker at the Palomar Observatory in California. The unlikely synchronous binary system has a rotation period of 3.3 hours. It was named after the discoverer's father-in-law, .

Orbit and classification 

George is a member of the Mars-crossing asteroids, a dynamically unstable group located between the main belt and the near-Earth populations, crossing the orbit of Mars at 1.66 AU. It is also a dynamical member of the Hungaria group.

It orbits the Sun in the innermost asteroid belt at a distance of 1.6–2.1 AU once every 2 years and 7 months (951 days; semi-major axis of 1.89 AU). Its orbit has a relatively low eccentricity of 0.13 and an inclination of 24° with respect to the ecliptic. The body's observation arc begins with its official discovery observation at Palomar in March 1983.

George family? 

Although George is a member of the dynamical Hungaria group, it is not a member of the collisional Hungaria family but an unrelated, non-family asteroid from the background population, according to Nesvorý, Milani and Knežević. However, in a 2014-abstract from the Asteroids, Comets, Meteors Conference in Helsinki (ACM 2014), George was mentioned as the principal body of a newly discovered low-density family in the Hungaria region.

Naming 

This minor planet was named after  (1904–1960), father of Carolyn Shoemaker's husband Eugene Shoemaker (1928–1997), who has previously been credited as the second discoverer. The official naming citation was published by the Minor Planet Center on 12 December 1989.

Physical characteristics 

George is an assumed stony S-type asteroid.

Lightcurve and satellite 

In November 2005, a rotational lightcurve of George was obtained from photometric observations by Brian Warner at his Palmer Divide Observatory in Colorado, United States. Lightcurve analysis gave a rotation period of  hours with a brightness amplitude of 0.14 magnitude. The observations showed possible hints of George being a binary asteroid with a minor-planet moon in its orbit. However, no conclusive evidence was produced due to insufficient data for a valid lightcurve analysis.

Follow-up observations by Warner in February 2009 gave a concurring period of  hours and an amplitude of 0.12 magnitude with no indications of mutual occultation/eclipsing events.

Diameter and albedo 

According to the survey carried out by the NEOWISE mission of NASA's Wide-field Infrared Survey Explorer (WISE), George measures between 3.02 and 3.26 kilometers in diameter and its surface has an albedo between 0.22 and 0.46. In 2017, a WISE-study dedicated to Mars-crossing asteroids gave a somewhat larger diameter of 3.62 kilometers with an albedo of 0.308. The Collaborative Asteroid Lightcurve Link assumes an albedo of 0.30 and calculates a diameter of 3.67 kilometers based on an absolute magnitude of 14.1.

Notes

References

External links 
 Asteroid 3854 George, Small Bodies Data Ferret
 Asteroid Lightcurve Database (LCDB), query form (info )
 Dictionary of Minor Planet Names, Google books
 Discovery Circumstances: Numbered Minor Planets (1)-(5000) – Minor Planet Center
 
 

003854
003854
Discoveries by Carolyn S. Shoemaker
Discoveries by Eugene Merle Shoemaker
Named minor planets
19830313